WRDB (1400 AM) is a radio station in Reedsburg, Wisconsin.  The station broadcasts at 1,000 watts from a tower located just west of Reedsburg.  WRDB also operates an FM translator at 97.3 FM. The station currently airs a mixture of oldies and sports - including Reedsburg Beavers high school football, boys and girls basketball, and baseball as well as Milwaukee Brewers baseball, ESPN Sunday Night Baseball and Wisconsin Badgers football, basketball and hockey. WRDB is the primary sports station in the Reedsburg & Wisconsin Dells area.

The station joined the Magnum Radio Group in 2007.

Previous logo

References

External links

RDB
Oldies radio stations in the United States
Sports radio stations in the United States
Radio stations established in 1967
Reedsburg, Wisconsin